Daniel Håkans (born 26 October 2000) is a Finnish football player currently playing for Norwegian Eliteserien side Vålerenga.

Håkans first moved abroad in 2022 on loan to Norwegian first-tier club Jerv. Despite Jerv being relegated, Håkans signed a permanent transfer ahead of the 2023 season. However, after only a short time Håkans was bought by Vålerenga as the replacement for Osame Sahraoui.

References

External links
 

2000 births
Living people
Sportspeople from Vaasa
Finnish footballers
Finland under-21 international footballers
Veikkausliiga players
Kakkonen players
Vasa IFK players
Seinäjoen Jalkapallokerho players
Association football midfielders
FK Jerv players
Vålerenga Fotball players
Eliteserien players
Finnish expatriate footballers
Expatriate footballers in Norway
Finnish expatriate sportspeople in Norway